The tbilat is a percussion instrument from Morocco which resembles bongos and tabla. It consists of a pair of decorated pottery drums, each with different size. The skinheads are stretched by plaited gut cords. This membranophone is placed on the ground between the legs, and played with both hands.

References
 Blades, James. Percussion instruments and their history. Bold Strummer Ltd; 4th edition (1992).

External links
 Tbilat played in Paco de Lucia's video

Directly struck membranophones
Arabic musical instruments
Moroccan musical instruments